The Battle of Ekeren, which took place on 30 June 1703, was a battle of the War of the Spanish Succession. The French surrounded the smaller Dutch force, which however managed to break out and retire to safety. The battle had no strategic effect whatsoever.

Prelude
After taking Bonn on 15 May, Marlborough now wanted to conquer Ostend, Antwerp, or force the French to an open battle. He ordered the Dutch general, Coehoorn, to march to Ostend and lay siege to it. Dutch general Van Sparre would march south west of Antwerp, Dutch general Obdam would march south from Bergen op Zoom, and Marlborough himself would march on Lier. 

Obdam had to send several of his battalions to join Coehoorn. Obdam's depleted force marched on 28 June from Bergen op Zoom to Antwerp. It arrived the next day at Ekeren, seven kilometres north of Antwerp, just south of Dutch held fort Lillo (top left of map).

After hearing about this, Villeroi sent a detachment force-marching from Diest to support the troops already around Antwerp to pounce on Obdam's force, before it could dig in or be reinforced.

The battle

Early in the morning of 30 June French dragoons marched from Merksem and Ekeren in the direction of Kapellen to cut off the escape route near Hoevenen for the Dutch to return to Breda and Bergen-op-Zoom. The Marquis of Bedmar and his Spanish troops were positioned near Wilmarsdonk. This ensured that the Dutch forces were surrounded on all sides by a force outnumbering them four to one.

Soon Dutch reconnaissance discovered the French dragoons and Obdam immediately sent his cavalry to Hoevenen, but it was too late, the village was packed with French troops. An attempt to conquer neighboring Muisbroek also failed. Then the French attacked, and Obdam tried to take Oorderen, an attack which was briefly successful before the French retook the village.

The fighting went on for the entire day. The engagement was long and bloody. Dutch drill and independently and quick thinking lower commanders made up for their lack in numbers. Towards the end, many units were out of ammunition, and several Dutch units continued to fight with fixed bayonets only. Meanwhile Hompesch gathered a number of cavalry squadrons and attacked some 1500 Franco-Spanish horseman crammed on a dyke. The Franco-Spanish cavalry fled and Hompesch pursued them for a distance of more than a kilometre. By eight o'clock there was no more sign of Obdam, and Slangenburg decided to attack Oorderen to force a breakthrough to safety. Friesheim sent his men wading through the water, appearing where the French had not expected them to. Here too the fighting was long and hard, but the attack was a success: the encirclement was broken and the Dutch troops could retire under cover of the night to fort Lillo.

Aftermath

The battle was undecided, but both sides claimed victory. The French because they ended up occupying the battlefield, the Dutch because they had forced the French from the battlefield, allowing the outnumbered Dutch to retire to safety. It may be considered an operational victory for the Two Crowns, because it stopped the Dutch move along the Scheldt. And it may be considered a tactical victory for the Dutch, because they managed to save most of their troops instead of losing them all.

Boufflers was blamed for letting a perfect chance slip through his fingers. Obdam had panicked in the afternoon and had managed to get through the enemy line with a handful of riders by throwing away their green field signs and orange sashes so everyone around thought them to be French. His behaviour was not forgiven by the Dutch military, and his military career was destroyed.
Slangenburg, for his part, was acclaimed as a Dutch hero. He was also furious at Marlborough, who had been outmanoeuvered by the French and had not come to the aid of the Dutch.

The Dutch officers and men had shown their best side while the French and Spanish troops, despite their superiority, had been unable to hold out anywhere. The Dutch infantry had once again proved to be the best in Europe, but it was the performance of the Dutch cavalry that most impressed contemporaries. They had shown that they were no longer inferior to the French and Spanish cavalry.

The Dutch took one gun, 2 sets of dragoon drums and at least 17 banners (several other had been reused as scarfs before they could be collected). 
The French and Spaniards lost at least 2,000 men. The Dutch lost 2,400 or 3,300 men depending on sources, as well as their 48 guns.

Modern location
A large part of the battlefield, including the villages of Oorderen, Wilmarsdonk and Lillo, has disappeared under the Port of Antwerp expansion in the 1960s.

Sources

References

Notes

External links
 Detailed but inaccurate Flemish description of the battle
 

Battle of Ekeren
Battles involving France
Battles involving the Dutch Republic
Battles of the War of the Spanish Succession
Battles involving the Spanish Netherlands
1703 in Europe
Battle of Ekeren
18th century in the Southern Netherlands